Culpeper County High School (CCHS) is a high school in Culpeper County, Virginia. Culpeper County High School was built in 1969, expanded in 2001 and significantly renovated between 2013 and 2015.

Facilities
The building is split into three levels.

The main floor has administrative offices, a library, studio, auditorium, cafeteria, and 65 classrooms. The second level houses administrative offices, the gymnasium and 16 classrooms. The third level houses a weight room, two shops, and three classrooms. The school hosts a Culinary Arts program, which is on campus in an adjacent building.   As of August 2017, the school's principal is Daniel Soderholm

Its gymnasium is named after William Pearson, one of its most popular principals, who served from the 1970s to the 1990s.

Academic opportunities 
In addition to courses on the CCHS campus, students can apply to participate in specialized programs that meet at off-campus locations.

A cohort of CCHS students attend Mountain Vista Governor's School to take advanced math, science, humanities, and research courses once they enter their sophomore, junior, and senior years. Additionally, through a partnership with Germanna Community College, students are offered the opportunity to enroll in Germanna Scholars. The successful completion of the Germanna Scholars program allows students to earn an associate degree before high school graduation.

See also
Eastern View High School
AA Evergreen District

References

External links
CCHS Official Webpage

Public high schools in Virginia
Schools in Culpeper County, Virginia